A list of films produced in Hong Kong in 2005:

2005

External links
 IMDB list of Hong Kong films
 Hong Kong films of 2005 at HKcinemamagic.com
 Hong Kong Filmography (1913-2006) at Hong Kong Film Archive

2005
2005 in Hong Kong
Hong Kong